Government Estate metro station is a Metro railway station on the Blue Line of the Chennai Metro. The station is among the underground stations along corridor I of the Chennai Metro, Wimco Nagar–Chennai International Airport stretch. The station serves the neighbourhoods of Chepauk, Triplicane and Chintadripet.

This metro station is very much useful for visitors to Ritchie Street and Ellis Road which are two very big commercial streets in Chennai city.

History

Etymology
The station is named so because of the presence of the Omandurar Government Estate in the vicinity.

Construction

The station
The station was opened for public on 10 February 2019. However, some portions of the construction work remains incomplete on the date of inauguration.

Structure
Government Estate is underground Metro station situated on Blue Line (Chennai Metro).

Station layout

Facilities
List of available ATM at Government Estate metro station are

Connections

Bus
Metropolitan Transport Corporation (Chennai) bus routes number 1A, 1B, 1C, 1D, 1J, 2A, 3A, 5C, 6A, 11A, 11G, 18A,  18D, 18E, 18K, 18R, 21, 22B, 26, 26B, 26CUT, 26J, 26M, 26R, 27B, 27BCUT, 27BET, 27E, 32, 38C, 40, 51J, 51P, 52, 52B, 52P, 60, 60A, 60D, 60H, 88A, 118A, 138C, 188, 221, 221H, A1, A51, B18, D51, E18, M21C, M51R, serves the station from nearby Simson bus stand.

Rail
Chintadripet railway station

Entry/Exit

See also

 Chennai
 Chintadripet
 Cooum River
 List of Chennai metro stations
 Chennai Metro
 Railway stations in Chennai
 Chennai Mass Rapid Transit System
 Chennai Monorail
 Chennai Suburban Railway
 Chintadripet railway station
 Chennai International Airport
 Transport in Chennai
 Urban rail transit in India
 List of metro systems

References

External links

 
 UrbanRail.Net – descriptions of all metro systems in the world, each with a schematic map showing all stations.

Chennai Metro stations
Railway stations in Chennai